Roland Smaniotto (17 July 1946 – 12 June 2011) was a Luxembourgian racing cyclist. He rode in the 1968 Tour de France.

References

1946 births
2011 deaths
Luxembourgian male cyclists
Place of birth missing